Maung Maung Lwin (also spelled Mg Mg Lwin, born 18 June 1995) is a Burmese professional footballer who plays as a winger for a Thai League 1 club Lamphun Warrior and the Myanmar national team. He also represented his country at the 2015 FIFA U-20 World Cup.

In 2022, he won the Thai League 2 with Lamphun, making him the first Burmese footballer to win a trophy abroad.

Club

International career

International

International goals
Scores and results list Myanmar's goal tally first.

Honours
National Team
AFC Asian Cup : 0000
FIFA World cup : 0000

Lamphun Warrior
 Thai League 2: 2021–22

Yangon United
Myanmar National League: 2018
MFF Charity Cup: 2018

Individual
 Best Player of the Year Awards: 2018
 M-150 Thai League 2 Man Of the Month: February

References

External links

Living people
1995 births
Burmese footballers
Hanthawaddy United F.C. players
Yangon United F.C. players
Lamphun Warriors F.C. players
Myanmar international footballers
Association football midfielders
Footballers at the 2018 Asian Games
Competitors at the 2017 Southeast Asian Games
Asian Games competitors for Myanmar
Competitors at the 2021 Southeast Asian Games
Southeast Asian Games competitors for Myanmar